Somon may refer to:

 Sōmon, the outer gate of a Japanese Buddhist temple
 Somon, Tajikistan, an administrative division in Tajikistan
 Sum (administrative division)